Lucas Hendley Glover (born November 12, 1979) is an American professional golfer who currently plays on the PGA Tour. He is best known for winning the 2009 U.S. Open.

Early years and amateur career
Glover was born in Greenville, South Carolina, the son of Ron Musselman and Hershey Hendley (the daughter of former pro football player Dick Hendley).  Musselman and Hendley separated in 1981 (when Lucas was two) and divorced the following year.  Musselman had a career as a major league baseball player from 1982 to 1985, but after his baseball career ended, Musselman fell behind on child support payments and went more than six months without seeing his son.  This led to a loss of parental rights after the matter went to court in 1992; Musselman also was barred from seeing Lucas (then 13) until he turned 18. Meanwhile, Hendley remarried to Jim Glover, and Lucas Glover today only recognizes his stepfather, Jim Glover, as his father.

Lucas' grandfather Dick Hendley introduced Glover to golf at age three, and by the time he was a teenager Lucas Glover was a three-time High School All-American at Wade Hampton High School. He won the South Carolina State High School championship as a freshman and sophomore and finished as the runner up as a junior and senior. Glover was All-State for all four years of high school.

Glover attended Clemson University from 1998 to 2001, where he was a brother of Alpha Tau Omega. He was named first-team All-American in 2000 and 2001 and honorable mention All-American in 1999. He was a member of the 2001 United States Walker Cup team and the 1999 USA vs. Japan Cup Team. He won three college tournaments and also won the South Carolina Amateur in 1998, 1999 and 2000 and the Sunnehanna Amateur in 2001.

Professional career

2002–2003: Nationwide Tour
Glover turned professional in 2001 after graduating from Clemson. He joined the Nationwide Tour in 2002, making 7 of 12 cuts while recording two top-10 finishes and five top-25 finishes in his rookie season. He earned $64,692 and finished 67th on the money list. Glover went to PGA Tour qualifying school for the first time where he finished tied for 39th which was not good enough to earn his tour card.

2003 was Glover's breakthrough year on the Nationwide Tour. He made 17 of 26 cuts while recording six top-10 finishes and 7 top-25 finishes. He picked up his first Nationwide Tour win at the Gila River Classic at Wild Horse Pass Resort. This win helped Glover finish 17th on the money list with $193,989. Glover's high finish on the money list earned him his PGA Tour card for 2004.

2004: PGA Tour rookie
In his rookie season on tour, Glover made 17 of 30 cuts while recording two top-10s and five top-25s. His best finishes came at the Wachovia Championship and the FUNAI Classic at the Walt Disney World Resort where he finished in a tie for 10th. He earned $557,454 and finished 134th on the money list, just shy of the top 125 which would have earned him his tour card for 2005. This forced him to go back to Q-School, although he was ultimately able to regain his card.

2005: First PGA Tour victory
Glover had a much better second year on tour. He made 16 of 28 cuts while recording 7 top-10 finishes and 9 top-25 finishes. He picked up his first PGA Tour victory at the FUNAI Classic at the Walt Disney World Resort in dramatic fashion by holing a 35-yard bunker shot on the 18th hole for birdie to avoid a playoff with Tom Pernice Jr. Glover went on to finish 30th on the money list with earnings of $2,050,068.

2006–2007: Continued success
Despite not winning an event in 2006, Glover played well on tour. He made 23 of 31 cuts and finished in the top-10 9 times and the top-25 17 times. His most impressive finish came at the WGC-Bridgestone Invitational where he finished in a tie for fourth. Another impressive finish came at The Tour Championship where he finished in a tie for eighth. He also made his first cut in a major at the PGA Championship where he finished in a tie for 46th. Glover earned $2,587,982 in 2006 and finished 31st on the money list. He was ranked in and out of the top 50 of Official World Golf Rankings during the year.

2007 was another good year for Glover. He made the cut in 22 of 29 events and recorded three top-10s and 13 top-25s. His best finish came at the PODS Championship where he finished in a tie for fourth. Glover earned $1,664,167 on the year and finished 53rd on the money list. He was selected for the 2007 Presidents Cup where the United States defeated the International team 19½ to 14½. Glover went 2–3 in his matches.

2008: Slump
2008 was not as successful as previous years for Glover. He made 20 of 26 cuts but only recorded two top-10s and eight top-25s. His best finishes came at the Verizon Heritage and the Buick Open where he finished in a tie for 7th. He earned $998,491 in 2008 and finished 105th on the money list.

2009: U.S. Open Champion
In February, Glover finished in a tie for third at the Buick Invitational. In May, he finished in a tie for second at the Quail Hollow Championship.

Glover won the U.S. Open at the Bethpage Black Course (Farmingdale, New York) by two strokes over Phil Mickelson, Ricky Barnes, and David Duval. He was a surprise winner of the event, being ranked 71st in the Official World Golf Ranking and never having made a cut in his three previous U.S. Open appearances. Glover was one of just a handful of players who won the U.S. Open after having to play in a sectional qualifier. He shot a second round 64, tying the low round of the week with Mike Weir. Glover entered the final round one stroke behind 54-hole leader Ricky Barnes but in tough conditions on Monday's final round, both Glover and Barnes struggled. Coming to the 16th hole, Glover was 4 over for the day without a birdie but that would soon change. He hit his approach shot to within 6 feet of the hole and made the putt to take a lead he would not relinquish. After sinking a 3-foot putt for par on 18, Glover won by a margin of two strokes. The win propelled him to 18th in the world rankings.

Glover would be honored for his U.S. Open win at a Clemson Alumni Association meeting in Greenville at Fluor Field the following month. He was the first Clemson graduate and the first native South Carolinian to win a major professional golf championship.

After his victory at Bethpage, Glover finished in a tie for 11th at the Travelers Championship the following week. The week after that, Glover finished in a tie for 5th at the AT&T National, moving Glover into the top 10 of the money list. In August, Glover finished 5th at the PGA Championship.

In October 2009, Glover won the PGA Grand Slam of Golf in Bermuda. The event featured the four major winners of 2009, Glover, Ángel Cabrera, Stewart Cink and Y. E. Yang. Glover won the two-day event by five strokes over Cabrera. Glover also earned his second President's Cup bid.

2011: Third PGA Tour win
On May 8, 2011, Glover defeated Jonathan Byrd, another former Clemson star, in a playoff to win the Wells Fargo Championship. This was his first official win on Tour since the 2009 U.S. Open.

2012: Injury
A left knee injury limited Glover to 16 events in 2012. He made six cuts with a season best of T46. He did not lose his Tour card due to the fact that he had two years remaining on the exemption from his U.S. Open win.

2015: Another slump
Glover finished the 2014–15 season 147th in the FedEx Cup. His exemptions for winning the U.S. Open and Wells Fargo Championship had run out. Glover had to either regain his PGA Tour card through the Web.com Tour Finals or play out of the conditional (126th–150th in the FedEx Cup) category for the 2015–16 season. Glover finished 14th in the finals, regaining his Tour card.

2016
Glover earned $948,927 during the 2015–16 PGA Tour Season. He finished 106th in the FedEx Cup and kept his PGA Tour card. His best finish was 8th in the Wells Fargo Championship.

2017
Glover earned $1,955,822 in 26 events during the 2016–17 PGA Tour Season. He finished 43rd in the season long FedEx Cup and kept his PGA Tour card. His best finish was third in the Shriners Hospitals for Children Open.

2018: Back to the Web.com Finals
Glover finished the 2017–18 PGA Tour Season 135th in the season long FedEx Cup. He made $789,382 in 18 tournaments, with 15 made cuts. Glover returned to the Web.com Tour Finals, where he finished 8th, thus regaining his PGA Tour card for the 2018–19 PGA Tour season.

2019
Glover started the 2018–19 PGA Tour Season with a T17 at the Safeway Open and T14 at the Sanderson Farms Championship. On November 3, 2018, during the third round of the Shriners Hospitals for Children Open, Glover shot 61 (10-under-par). He started his round with a bogey at the 10th but managed seven birdies and a pair of eagles from that point on. This matched his career-low round on the PGA Tour (9-under 61 in round 2 of the 2016 Wyndham Championship). Glover entered the final round in third place. In the fourth round, Glover shot 71 and finished in T7. Glover then finished in the top 12 finishers in 5 of his next 6 PGA Tour starts, this included a T4 at the 2019 Honda Classic. As of March 12, 2019, Glover had earned $1,372,193 for the season, good for 23rd on the money list.

2021
In July 2021, Glover won the John Deere Classic by two shots. In the final round, Glover shot seven-under par 64. This ended a drought of 10 years without a win on the PGA Tour.

Personal life
Glover has lived in St. Simons Island, Georgia, Simpsonville, South Carolina, and Tequesta, Florida. He has two children with his wife Krista. Krista was arrested and charged with domestic violence and resisting arrest in Ponte Vedra, Florida during the 2018 Players Championship. Several months after the incident once it was over, Glover made a public statement that his wife is not on probation nor will she have to proceed with substance abuse or mental health evaluation. He also added that she never hit him.

Amateur wins
1998 South Carolina Amateur
1999 South Carolina Amateur
2000 South Carolina Amateur
2001 Sunnehanna Amateur

Professional wins (7)

PGA Tour wins (4)

PGA Tour playoff record (1–0)

Nationwide Tour wins (1)

Other wins (2)

Major championships

Wins (1)

Results timeline
Results not in chronological order in 2020.

CUT = missed the half way cut
"T" indicates a tie for a place
NT = No tournament due to COVID-19 pandemic

Summary

Most consecutive cuts made – 4 (twice)
Longest streak of top-10s – 1 (twice)

Results in The Players Championship

CUT = missed the halfway cut
"T" indicates a tie for a place
C = Canceled after the first round due to the COVID-19 pandemic

Results in World Golf Championships
Results not in chronological order before 2015.

1Cancelled due to COVID-19 pandemic

QF, R16, R32, R64 = Round in which player lost in match play
NT = No tournament
"T" = Tied
Note that the HSBC Champions did not become a WGC event until 2009.

PGA Tour career summary

*Through the 2020 season.
Glover was not a member of the PGA Tour until 2004.

U.S. national team appearances
Amateur
Palmer Cup: 2000, 2001 (winners)
Walker Cup: 2001

Professional
Presidents Cup: 2007 (winners), 2009 (winners)

See also
2003 Nationwide Tour graduates
2004 PGA Tour Qualifying School graduates
2015 Web.com Tour Finals graduates
2018 Web.com Tour Finals graduates

References

External links

Profile on Clemson Golf's official site

American male golfers
Clemson Tigers men's golfers
PGA Tour golfers
Winners of men's major golf championships
Korn Ferry Tour graduates
Golfers from South Carolina
Golfers from Georgia (U.S. state)
Golfers from Florida
Sportspeople from Greenville, South Carolina
People from St. Simons, Georgia
People from Simpsonville, South Carolina
People from Tequesta, Florida
1979 births
Living people